Hasan Mahmood Khan OSP, GUP, nswc, psc is a Bangladesh Air Force officer who is serving as Assistant Chief of Air Staff (Planning). Before that, he served as Air Officer Commanding (AOC) of BAF Base Bangabandhu.

Career 
Khan served as Officer Commanding of Airmen Training Institute from 9 July 2008 to 24 March 2009. He also served as Bangladesh Air Force plans director while he was Air Commodore. He oversaw 2 important bi lateral defence programme. The Indo-Pacific Endeavour 2022 with Australian Defence force and Exercise Cope South-2022 with US pacific air force.

References 

Bangladesh Air Force personnel
Living people
Year of birth missing (living people)